Fulwood was an urban district of Lancashire, England.

It was subject to some changes in its boundaries:

1 April 1934: lost  to County Borough of Preston
1 April 1934: gained  from Preston Rural District (Ribbleton and parts of Broughton, Lea, Ashton, Ingol and Cottam)
1 April 1952: lost  to County Borough of Preston

It was abolished in 1974 and incorporated into the Borough of Preston district.

References

Urban districts of England
Districts of England created by the Local Government Act 1894
Districts of England abolished by the Local Government Act 1972
Local government in Preston